The 2003 Princeton Tigers football team was an American football team that represented Princeton University during the 2003 NCAA Division I-AA football season. Princeton finished second-to-last in the Ivy League.

In their fourth year under head coach Roger Hughes, the Tigers compiled a 2–8 record and were outscored 267 to 204. Tim Kirby and Dave Splitthoff were the team captains.

Princeton's 2–5 conference placed seventh in the Ivy League standings. The Tigers were outscored 181 to 175 by Ivy opponents. 

The Tigers played their home games at Princeton Stadium, on the university campus in Princeton, New Jersey.

Schedule

References

Princeton
Princeton Tigers football seasons
Princeton Tigers football